Cosmetra tumulata is a species of moth of the family Tortricidae first described by Edward Meyrick in 1908. It is found in South Africa.

This species has forewing lengths of 5.2 mm, forewings weakly expanding posteriorly, ground colouration is brownish cream, partly tinged grey and suffused brownish.

References

Moths described in 1908
Olethreutini